The McGuerins from Brooklyn is a 1942 American comedy film directed by Kurt Neumann and written by Earle Snell and Clarence Marks. The film stars William Bendix, Grace Bradley, Arline Judge, Max Baer, Marjorie Woodworth, Joe Sawyer, Marion Martin and Rex Evans. The film was released on December 31, 1942, by United Artists.

This was the second of the so-called Taxi Comedies series, which featured Bendix, Sawyer, and Bradley playing the same characters. The first film was Brooklyn Orchid and the last film was Taxi, Mister.

Plot

Cast  
 William Bendix as Timothy 'Tim' McGuerin
 Grace Bradley as Sadie McGuerin
 Arline Judge as Marcia Marsden
 Max Baer as Professor Samson
 Marjorie Woodworth as Lucy Gibbs
 Joe Sawyer as Eddie Corbett 
 Marion Martin as Myrtle, Marcia's friend
 Rex Evans as Sterling, McGuerin's Butler
 J. Farrell MacDonald as Cop
 Pat Flaherty as Pat, gym attendant
 Alan Hale, Jr. as Alan, gym attendant

References

External links 
 

1942 films
American black-and-white films
Films directed by Kurt Neumann
United Artists films
1942 comedy films
American comedy films
1940s English-language films
1940s American films